Nicolas Fillon (born January 14, 1986 in Suresnes, France) is a French athlete who specialises in the 400 meters. Fillon competed at the 2010 IAAF World Indoor Championships.

References

French male sprinters
1986 births
Living people
Sportspeople from Suresnes
Mediterranean Games silver medalists for France
Mediterranean Games medalists in athletics
Athletes (track and field) at the 2009 Mediterranean Games